Anslom Nakikus is a Papua New Guinean singer. He has been described by Solomon Islands' leading newspaper Solomon Times as "the popular singing sensation of Papua New Guinea".

Reggae is dominant in his music.

He has produced two albums to date. His second album, produced with Mangrove Productions, is entitled Fool Moon.

His work has been featured in that of domestic and foreign artists, such as PNG's Leonard Kania's "Queen 4 lane", X-vibes' "Teharoa", Kuakumba's "Leaving Me Lonely", Solomon Islander Sharzy's "Hem Stret", New Caledonian Fedyz's "Noumea", and Fijian Lia Osbourne's "Ain't No Sunshine".

He has been Rabaul Band's Barike lead vocalist since Kanai Pineri left, and sings for Barike in the album Frek Tasol. He is of Barike descent.

Discography 
 Don't You Lie (1999)
 Aross (2001)
 Bongbong (2002)
 Crazy Best of Anslom (2007)
 Fool Moon (2008)
 Pee N Gee (2014)
 Love Me Again (2019)

External links 
 Portuguese biography
 Anslom blog and biography (Fan site)

References 

Papua New Guinean singers
Living people
Year of birth missing (living people)